Rabdophaga iteobia is a gall midge which forms galls on the buds of willow species.

Description
The gall is an elongated rosette or artichoke, with a diameter up to 15 mm; the leaves may be hairy. There is one generation a year, the larvae are orange and pupate in the ground.

The gall has been found on the following species:
 Salix aurita – eared willow
 Salix caprea – goat willow
 Salix cinerea – grey willow
 Salix glauca – glaucous willow
 Salix repens – creeping willow

Distribution
Found in the following European counties: Belgium and the United Kingdom.

References

iteobia
Nematoceran flies of Europe
Gall-inducing insects
Insects described in 1890
Taxa named by Jean-Jacques Kieffer
Willow galls